Philip J. Davis (January 2, 1923 – March 14, 2018) was an American academic applied mathematician.

Davis was born in Lawrence, Massachusetts. He was known for his work in numerical analysis and approximation theory, as well as his investigations in the history and philosophy of mathematics. He earned his degrees in mathematics from Harvard University (SB, 1943; PhD, 1950, advisor Ralph P. Boas, Jr.), and his final position was Professor Emeritus at the Division of Applied Mathematics at Brown University.

He served briefly in an aerodynamics research position in the Air Force in World War II before joining the National Bureau of Standards (now the National Institute of Standards and Technology). He became Chief of Numerical Analysis there and worked on the well-known Abramowitz and Stegun Handbook of Mathematical Functions before joining Brown in 1963.

He was awarded the Chauvenet Prize for mathematical writing in 1963 for an article on the gamma function, and won numerous other prizes, including being chosen to deliver the 1991 Hendrick Lectures of the MAA (which became the basis for his book Spirals: From Theodorus to Chaos). He was a frequent invited lecturer and authored several books. Among the best known are The Mathematical Experience (with Reuben Hersh), a popular survey of modern mathematics and its history and philosophy; Methods of Numerical Integration (with Philip Rabinowitz), long the standard work on the subject of quadrature; and Interpolation and Approximation, still an important reference in this area.

For The Mathematical Experience (1981), Davis and Hersh won a National Book Award in Science.

Davis also wrote an autobiography, The Education of a Mathematician; some of his other books include autobiographical sections as well. In addition, he published works of fiction. His best-known book outside the field of mathematics is The Thread: A Mathematical Yarn (1983, 2nd ed. 1989), which "has raised Digression into a literary form" (Gerard Piel); it takes off from the name of the Russian mathematician Tschebyscheff, and in the course of explaining why he insists on that "barbaric, Teutonic, non-standard orthography" (in the words of a reader of Interpolation and Approximation who wrote him to complain), he digresses in many amusing directions.

Davis died on March 14, 2018, at the age of 95.

Publications (Books Only)
Ancient Loons: Stories Pingree Told Me (2016)
Circulant matrices
Descartes' Dream: The World According to Mathematics by Philip J. Davis and Reuben Hersh
Interpolation and approximation
Mathematical Encounters of the Second Kind 
Mathematics & Common Sense: A Case of Creative Tension (2006)
Mathematics, Substance and Surmise: Views on the Meaning and Ontology of Mathematics by Ernest Davis and Philip J. Davis
Methods of numerical integration
Numerical Integration by Philip Davis, Philip J & Rabinowitz
Spirals: From Theodorus to Chaos
The Companion Guide to the Mathematical Experience: by Philip J. Davis and Reuben
The Education of a Mathematician (2000)
The Lore of Large Numbers (1975)
The Mathematical Experience (Modern Birkhäuser Classics) (2011)
The mathematics of matrices: A first book of matrix theory and linear algebra
The Schwarz Function and Its Applications (Carus Mathematical Monographs #17) (1974)
The Thread: A Mathematical Yarn
Thomas Gray in Copenhagen: In Which the Philosopher Cat Meets the Ghost of Hans Christian Andersen (1995)
Unity and Disunity and Other Mathematical Essays, American Math Society, (2015)

Notes

References

External links
Personal web site at Brown University.
Official web site at Brown University.
Interview at SIAM 

Bibliography

1923 births
2018 deaths
People from Lawrence, Massachusetts
20th-century American mathematicians
21st-century American mathematicians
Brown University faculty
Harvard University alumni
National Book Award winners
Numerical analysts
Writers from Massachusetts
Mathematicians from Massachusetts
American military personnel of World War II